FIVB Volleyball Nations League may refer to
 FIVB Volleyball Men's Nations League
 FIVB Volleyball Women's Nations League